Chandragiri is a suburb and neighbourhood of Tirupati and located in Tirupati district of the Indian state of Andhra Pradesh. It is a part of Tirupati urban agglomeration and a major growing residential area in Tirupati It is the mandal headquarters of Chandragiri mandal in Tirupati revenue division. It also falls in the jurisdictional limit of Tirupati Urban Development Authority. Chandragiri is the southwestern entrance of Tirupati for vehicles coming from Bangalore, Kerala and Tamil Nadu. Kalyana Venkateswara Temple, Srinivasamangapuram is located next to Chandragiri through which well-laid stone footpaths called srivari mettu are available to reach Tirumala on foot

History

Chandragiri fort 

Chandragiri is now famous for the historical fort, built in the 11th century, and the Raja Mahal (Palace) within it. The fort encircles eight ruined temples of Saivite and Vaishnavite pantheons, Raja Mahal, Rani Mahal and other ruined structures.

The Raja Mahal Palace is now an archaeological museum. The fort and palace are in the care of the Archaeological Survey of India. The palace is open to the public, but the fort is closed. The palace is an example of Indo-Sarcen architecture of the Vijayanagar period. The palace was constructed using stone, brick, lime mortar and devoid of timber. The crowning towers represents the Hindu architectural elements.

Chandragiri was under the rule of Vijayanagar from 1367. It came into prominence during Saluva Narasimha Rayalu. Chandragiri was the 4th capital of Vijayanagar Empire. Rayas shifted their capital to here when Golconda sultans attacked Penukonda. In 1646, the fort was annexed to the Golkonda territory.

The  Mysore king ordered the Palaygara (feudatory ruler) Bisaya nayaka who took aid from Mysore Kingdom after decline of Vijayanagara Empire. Bisaya nayaka of  Harapanayakanahalli, present Mulbagal (T) Kolar (D) of Karnataka, Waged a war against the sultan of Chandragiri fort in which he and his army killed every one inside the fort. (there is myth that only the nose rings collected from dead Muslim women were 3 full bamboo bucket, which is sealed in 2 stone locker in Kurudumale Village, Karnataka) Later after the death of sulthan it subsequently came under Mysore rule. It went into oblivion from 1792 onward.

References 

Tirupati
Mandal headquarters in Tirupati district
Buildings and structures in Tirupati